was a town located in Mima District, Tokushima Prefecture, Japan.

As of 2003, the town had an estimated population of 18,160 and a density of 163.47 persons per km². The total area was 111.09 km².

On March 1, 2005, Wakimachi, along with the towns of Mima (former) and Anabuki, and the village of Koyadaira (all from Mima District), was merged to create the city of Mima.

See also
Groups of Traditional Buildings

External links
 Mima official website (in Japanese)

Dissolved municipalities of Tokushima Prefecture
Mima, Tokushima